Chard School is a coeducational private school for children ages 4 to 11 located in the town of Chard in the English county of Somerset.

The school is located on the site of the former Chard Grammar School.

History
The school was originally a private residence, built for John Symes of Poundsford in 1583. Later in 1671, his son, William Symes, handed the property over to twelve trustees for conversion into a grammar school. It later became a public boarding school in 1890.

The current independent preparatory school, known as Chard School, was established in 1972, and still incorporates the original grammar school building. The 16th century building has been Grade II* listed since 1950. It is also on Historic England's Heritage at Risk Register, where it is described as being in poor condition.

Architecture
The two-storey flint building has hamstone dressings, a tiled roof and brick chimney stacks. The front of the building has a three-room range and a projecting three-storey porch. Many of the rooms have fireplaces, panelling and decorations from the 16th to 19th centuries. In the 18th century a staircase was added giving access to the adjacent Monmouth House which was built between 1770 and 1790.

References

Chard, Somerset
Defunct grammar schools in England
Grade II* listed buildings in South Somerset
1671 establishments in England
Educational institutions established in the 17th century
Preparatory schools in Somerset